Claymates is a platform game for the Super Nintendo Entertainment System (SNES). It is one of Interplay's clay animation titles which also included the ClayFighter series.

Overview

The protagonist of the game is a boy named Clayton, whose scientist father has developed a serum that can transform people into animals when it's combined with clay. Suddenly, Jobo the witch doctor appears and demands the formula for the serum. The father refuses, to which Jobo replies by changing Clayton into a ball of clay and stealing away both his father and the serum. Clayton vows to save his father in spite of his new form and embarks on a journey through his backyard, the Pacific, Japan, Africa, and finally outer space. The player uses samples of serum lying around in these levels to transform into one of five different animals (Muckster the Cat, Doh-Doh the Duck, Oozy the Mouse, Goopy the Guppy, and Globmeister the Gopher) to best fit with the environment and make it to the end of the level. Special abilities that are in a clay ball transform Clayton into helpful animals as he races the clock to collect as much as possible and still make it to the end, jumping over obstacles and attacking with the animal in use. Clayton must also be careful not to be hit while a blob or he'll die.

Development and release
Claymates was developed by Visual Concepts and published by Interplay Productions. Interplay entered into a distribution contract with clay animation studio Cineplay Interactive, a subsidiary of Will Vinton Productions which also included the fighting game ClayFighter and the chess game Battle Chess 4000. Claymates was produced by Interplay veteran Michael Quarles, designed by Gregory A. Thomas of Visual Concepts, and animated by A-OK Animation, the last of which was responsible for mascots such as Gumby and the Pillsbury Doughboy. Thomas conceived Claymates under the working title "Animal Connection" for the Nintendo Entertainment System before production moved to the SNES. Quarles stated the game's clay characters were made in an attempt "to have the consistency of something like Flintstones in character and story" while Thomas claimed was designed to have "the speed of Sonic, the maps of Mario, and colors that have never been done before". For the game's audio, Interplay employed the Advanced Real-time Dynamic Interplay (ARDI) Sound System. This proprietary MIDI tool allowed composers to play music and sound effects directly from SNES ROM files to save on memory by only occupying 18 kilobytes of space.

Characters from Claymates would also appear in the pre-fight introductions of ClayFighter, which was released around the same time. The line "Blaze Processing" featured on the box art and in the manual of Claymates is a reference to Sega's claims of "Blast Processing" in some its US Sega Genesis advertisements. A Genesis version of Claymates was planned but never released.  In July 2021, Claymates was added to the Nintendo Switch Online classic games service.

Reception

Claymates received mostly positive reviews.

Notes

References

External links

1993 video games
Cancelled Nintendo Entertainment System games
Cancelled Sega Genesis games
Clay animation video games
Interplay Entertainment games
Nintendo Switch Online games
Platform games
Single-player video games
Super Nintendo Entertainment System games
Super Nintendo Entertainment System-only games
Video games about shapeshifting
Video games scored by Charles Deenen
Video games set in Africa
Video games set in Japan
Video games set in outer space
Video games set in the United States
Video games with digitized sprites
Video games with underwater settings
Video games developed in the United States